The 2019 New York City Marathon was the 49th running of the annual marathon race held in New York City, United States, which took place on November 3, 2019. The men's race was won by Kenyan Geoffrey Kamworor in a time of 2:08:13. The women's race was won in 2:22:38 by Kenyan Joyciline Jepkosgei, making her official debut at the distance. The men and women's wheelchair races, were won by American Daniel Romanchuk (1:37:24) and Switzerland's Manuela Schär (1:44:20), respectively. A total of 53,508 runners finished the race, comprising 30,794 men and 22,714 women.

Course

The New York City Marathon starts at Fort Wadsworth on Staten Island, New York City. The first two miles of the course stay on the island, before the runners cross the Verrazzano-Narrows Bridge into Brooklyn. The streets in this borough are flat and the runners remain here until mile 12. The runners then enter Queens before crossing the Queensboro Bridge at mile 13.

After crossing the bridge, the runners enter Manhattan and run down First Avenue. The runners then enter The Bronx for miles 19 and 20 and pass the 'Entertainment Zone' which includes bands and dancers. The course then re-enters Manhattan for the final . After running through Harlem, there is a slight uphill section along Fifth Avenue before it flattens out and runs parallel to Central Park. The course then enters the park around mile 24, passes Columbus Circle at mile 25 and re-enters the park for the finish.

Field
In the women's race, 2018 winner Mary Keitany and half-marathon world record holder Joyceline Jepkosgei were favorites. Keitany was a four-time winner of the race, but Jepkosgei had never run a marathon race before. Also racing were Des Linden, Worknesh Degefa, and Ruti Aga, the respective winners of the 2018, and 2019 Boston Marathon, and 2019 Tokyo Marathon. The men's field included three sub-2:06 runners; Tamirat Tola, Lelisa Desisa, and Shura Kitata, all of whom are from Ethiopia. Desisa was the favorite, however, having won the 2013 and 2015 Boston Marathon, and the 2018 New York City Marathon. 2017 winner Geoffrey Kamworor of Kenya also raced.

In the wheelchair race, the men's favorite was 20-year-old Daniel Romanchuk who had won the 2018 edition, 2019 Chicago Marathon, 2019 Boston Marathon, and the 2019 London Marathon. Also racing were David Weir, Ernst Van Dyk, and Marcel Hug, all previous winners of the race. In the women's wheelchair race, the favorite was Manuela Schär who had won the last six World Marathon Majors in a row. She faced the greatest competition from Americans Tatyana McFadden, Amanda McGrory, and Susannah Scaroni.

The wheelchair race started at 8:30 EST (UTC-5), the women's at 9:10 EST and the men's at 9:40 EST. The winners of the men and women's races each won $100,000, and $25,000 each in the wheelchair category whilst a prize of $25,000 was given to the fastest man and woman from the United States. The temperature on the day of the race was an "ideal" .

Race summary
In the women's wheelchair race, Schär took an early lead and won with little competition from the other athletes in a time of 1:44:20. McFadden and Scaroni finished second and third in 1:48:19 and 1:51:37, respectively. The men's wheelchair race, on the other hand, was much more tightly contested. They went through  in 31:11 side-by-side and at halfway were both over a minute ahead of the chasing group comprising Weir and Aaron Pike. At  the gap had been brought down to 50 seconds and 10 kilometres later, the two groups had joined up. Once again, Romanchuk was able to get clear of the rest, and crossed the finish line in first place just one second ahead of Hug, as was the case the previous year. Romanchuk finished in 1:37:24, Hug in 1:37:25, Weir finished three seconds behind in 1:37:28, and Pike finished 5 seconds behind in 1:37:33. The men's handcycle race was won by Omar Duran and the women's was won by Devann Murphy.

American Sara Hall dropped out with a stomach illness after . At  into the race, Keitany and Jepkosgei were in the lead together, but  later, Jepkosgei began to pull away and had put a four second gap between the two. The lead further increased to 16 seconds by mile 25 and she eventually finished in a time of 2:22:38, 54 seconds ahead of Keitany who finished second. Ruti Aga finished third in a time of 2:25:51. Jepkosgei's time is the second fastest on the course, behind the 2003 performance by Margaret Okayo. She was also the youngest winner, at the age of 25, since Okayo won in 2001. Sinead Diver, at 42-years-old, was the oldest woman to finish in the top five since Priscilla Welch won in 1987. Jepkosgei, in addition to the $100,000 of prize money, also earned $45,000 for finishing in under 2:23:00. Linden won the prize for fastest American, finishing sixth in 2:26:26.

In the men's race, Desisa dropped out after  due to tightness in his hamstring. ABC News suggested that the cause was his "taxing" victory in the marathon event at the 2019 World Athletics Championships in Doha, Qatar just 29 days earlier. The leading group went through  in 30:32, and halfway in 1:04:49, with fourteen still present. Brett Robinson broke away from the pack and led through mile 15 in 1:14:13, but was caught within the next mile. The group had dwindled to just five runners when they reached mile 20 in 1:38:59; Kamworor, Girma Bekele Gebre, Albert Korir, Kitata, and Tola. The group further broke up and Kamworor eventually left Korir in the 24th mile and was able to win the race in 2:08:13. Korir finished in second with a time of 2:08:36. Girma Bekele Gebre, an unsponsored Ethiopian who started with the open field instead of the elite runners, finished in third place in 2:08:38. He also came to the race with no agent, and had stayed with a friend in The Bronx. Jared Ward won the prize for the top American, finishing sixth in 2:10:45.

Non-elite race
There were 53,627 finishers from 141 countries in the non-elite race, up from 52,812 in 2018, making it the largest marathon in history. The race had a 98.9 percent completion rate with 578 dropping out.

Results
Sources:

Men

Women

Wheelchair men

Wheelchair women

Handcycle men

Handcycle women

References

External links

New York Road Runners website

2019
New York City Marathon
New York City Marathon
Marathon
New York City Marathon